The Institute of Biochemistry and Biophysics (IBB) 
is a pioneering Iranian research institute founded in 1976 to conduct world class research in cellular and molecular biology. It is affiliated with University of Tehran and is located in the university campus.

IBB is an educational and research oriented center for training postgraduate students both nationally and internationally. Interdisciplinary research is one of the main themes at the institute.

History
At first, IBB was known as the Department of Cellular and Molecular Biology, but later separated to three departments of Biochemistry, Biophysics and Bioinformatics as will be described below. Master's degrees in Biochemistry and Biophysics were established in 1986 and 1990, respectively and PhD degrees in Biochemistry and Biophysics were established in 1989 and 1996, respectively. Initially IBB was divided into two independent educational groups of Biochemistry and Biophysics in 2002. The department of Bioinformatics was established in 2005 just for training Ph.D. students.

Research and Facilities
Currently, IBB is composed of three departments of Biochemistry, Biophysics and Bioinformatics with 21 full-time faculty members of which 10 members are Professors. The department also has 35 administrative staff members. IBB has 17 research laboratories, a general communal use equipments laboratory, a greenhouse, an animal house, a number of computer laboratories, a library and a restaurant.

National and international forum affiliated at IBB:

1. IBB is an affiliated Center of The World Academy of Science(TWAS) in Iran

2. Iranian Secretariat of  UNESCO chair on Interdisciplinary Research in Diabetes, (UCIRD) located at IBB

3. Iranian Secretariat of the International Union of Biochemistry and Molecular Biology (IUBMB) located at IBB

4. Iranian Secretariat of the Federation of Asian and Oceanian Biochemists and Molecular Biologists (FAOBMB)

5.Center of Excellence in Biothermodynamics (CEBiotherm) is located at IBB

6. The Secretariat of the Iran Society of Biophysical Chemistry (ISOBC)  is  located at IBB

7. The Secretariat of Iranian BioInformatics Society (IBIS)

8. IBB is affiliated with the Nanotechnology Laboratory Network 

Labs

 Research  Laboratories
 Communal Laboratory

Library

The Institute of Biochemistry and Biophysics' (IBB) library was founded in 1976. IBB's library contains 10,000 professional books and 900 thesis in the fields of Biochemistry, Biophysics and Bioinformatics. IBB library offers services to all students inside and outside of IBB. Students and researchers register as a library member to benefit from all the valuable facilities of this professional library. The library includes a good archive of previously published journal issues. The IBB library is rich in international documents for specialized fields and is a renowned library in Iran and the regional countries. This library is one of the best libraries at the University of Tehran.

Notable faculty and alumni
 Ali Akbar Moosavi-Movahedi
 Alireza Mashaghi
 Mohammad Nabi Sarbolouki

See also
 List of Iranian Research Centers
 The Physical Society of Iran
 Iran Bioinformatics Center

References

External links 
  The institute webpage 

Biophysics organizations
University of Tehran
Research institutes in Iran
Biochemistry research institutes
Scientific organizations established in 1976
UNESCO
University of Tehran faculties